The following is a list of anti-communist books, this being books heavily critical or expressing opposition towards the ideology of communism as a central or reoccurring theme. Some of these works may overlap communism with socialism, particularly those based on or set in the Soviet Union. This list does not include McCarthyism books, nor does this list include books that merely make brief trivial mentions of communism in a negative light.

Non-fiction
 Egg on Mao: The Story of an Ordinary Man Who Defaced an Icon and Unmasked a Dictatorship by Denise Chong (Chinese-Canadian; 2009)
 The Black Book of Communism: Crimes, Terror, Repression by Éditions Robert Laffont (publisher) and various (French; 1997)
 The God that Failed by Louis Fischer, André Gide, Arthur Koestler, Ignazio Silone, Stephen Spender, and Richard Wright (various; 1949)

Fiction
 An Excess Male by Maggie Shen King (Chinese-American; 2017)
 Necromancy Cottage, Or, The Black Art of Gnawing On Bones by Rebecca Maye Holiday (French-Canadian; 2019)
 One Day in the Life of Ivan Denisovich by Aleksandr Solzhenitsyn (Russian; 1962)
 Sofia Petrovna by Lydia Chukovskaya (Soviet; 1939–40)
 We The Living by Ayn Rand (American, 1936)

See also
 Anti-communism
 Criticism of Marxism
 Criticism of socialism
 Anti-Leninism
 Anti-Stalinist left
 Anti-Sovietism

References

Communism
Socialism
Politics in popular culture
Anti-communism

Lists of books